Everybody Got Their Something was the first album released in 2001 by pop/soul singer Nikka Costa. Although she had released several albums internationally as a child, this was her first release in the United States, and was released on May 22, 2001 by Virgin Records. It peaked at #120 on the Billboard 200 in June 2001. As of 2005, it has shifted 250,000 units in United States.

Uses in media
The title song "Everybody Got Their Something" was originally released as a single in 2000, and was featured in various media: in the pilots of the TV series Arrested Development and Drop Dead Diva; the movies Blue Crush, Coach Carter and All About Steve; and in episodes of the TV series Buffy the Vampire Slayer, Felicity, ER, and Nip/Tuck; and was used in promos for ABC Daytime. On the strength of the song, she then recorded and released the eponymous album the following year. Chase also used the song in a 2020 commercial.
The first single, "Like a Feather," was Costa's biggest hit. The song samples "I Dig Love" by George Harrison. It was used in many of Tommy Hilfiger's advertising campaigns. 
The song "Push & Pull" was featured in the movie Blow, starring Johnny Depp, and the video was included on its DVD release. Prince covered "Push & Pull" on his direct-to-DVD concert Live at the Aladdin Las Vegas, with the help of Costa.
The song "So Have I for You" (co-written by the Beastie Boys) was used in the 2002 Britney Spears movie Crossroads.

Track listing

Leftover tracks
Several tracks were recorded for Everybody Got Their Something, but later excluded from the final release. 
"Heaven Sinner" appears as a b-side on the "Like a Feather" single and on some promotional copies of the album.
Early promotional versions of the album featured the tracks "La La La", "Stranger's Way", "Comes Around, Goes Around" and "Rain". The track "Rain" is an extended version of "I Don't Want to Be the Rain", which is featured on the Japanese edition of the album. "Comes Around, Goes Around" has been occasionally performed live.
A stripped-down, acoustic version of "Push & Pull" is featured on the soundtrack of the 2001 movie Blow.
An extended version of "Everybody Got Their Something" is featured on the 2009 movie All About Steve.

Personnel
Credits for Everybody Got Their Something adapted from Allmusic

Questlove - drums
Printz Board - keyboards, trumpet
Pat Burkholder - assistant, assistant engineer
David Campbell - string arrangements
Larry Corbett - cello
Nikka Costa - arranger, Celeste, Fender Rhodes, guitar (acoustic), piano, producer, vocal arrangement, vocals, Wurlitzer
Richard Dodd - cello
Russell Elevado - engineer, mixing
Mark Anthony Jones - guitar
Pete Magdaleno - assistant, assistant engineer

Pino Palladino - bass
Len Peltier - art direction, design, photography
James Poyser - clavinet, Wurlitzer
Billy Preston - clavinet
Tony Rambo - assistant, assistant engineer
Jeff Skelton - assistant, assistant engineer
Luis Sanchez - photography
Justin Stanley - bass, Chamberlin, clavinet, digital editing, drums, engineer, guitar, Mellotron, Mini Moog, producer, xylophone
Dominique Trenier - executive producer
Scott Wolfe - assistant, assistant engineer

Singles
"Like a Feather" (#53 UK)
"Push & Pull" (Promo only)
"Everybody Got Their Something" (Promo only)

References 

2001 albums
Nikka Costa albums
Albums produced by Mark Ronson
Rock albums by American artists